Chidawan Anandamrongchai (former name Tanaporn Polrueng ); born  is a Thai female volleyball player. She was part of the Thailand women's national volleyball team.

She participated in the 2012 FIVB Volleyball World Grand Prix.

Awards

Clubs
 2012–13 Thailand League -  Champion, with Idea Khonkaen
 2013 Thai-Denmark Super League -  Champion, with Idea Khonkaen
 2014–15 Thailand League -  Bronze medal, with Idea Khonkaen

References

External links
 FIVB profile

1994 births
Living people
Chidawan Anandamrongchai
Chidawan Anandamrongchai
Chidawan Anandamrongchai